Cognate ("related by birth") may mean:

 Cognates, words that have a common etymological origin
 False cognates, words that appear to be cognates, but are not
 Cognate object, a verb's object that is etymologically related to the verb
 Cognate (kinship), person who shares a common ancestor
 Cognate linkage, a kinematic linkage that generates the same coupler curve as another linkage of a different geometry

See also
 Connation, in plants, the fusion of organs of the same type

de:Kognat